Howard Browne (April 15, 1908 – October 28, 1999) was an American science fiction editor and mystery writer.  He also wrote for several television series and films.  Some of his work appeared over the pseudonyms John Evans, Alexander Blade, Lawrence Chandler, Ivar Jorgensen, and Lee Francis.

Biography
Beginning in 1942, Browne worked as managing editor for Ziff Davis publications on Amazing Stories and Fantastic Adventures, both under Raymond A. Palmer's editorship.  When Palmer left the magazines in 1949, Browne took over in January 1950.  Browne ended the publication of Richard Shaver's Shaver Mystery and oversaw the change in Amazing from a pulp magazine to a digest.  He left the magazines in 1956 to move to Hollywood.

In Hollywood, Browne wrote for television shows including Maverick ("The Seventh Hand" with James Garner and Diane Brewster among nine other episodes), Ben Casey, and The Virginian.  His last credit was for the film Capone (1975), starring Ben Gazzara.

Browne's novel Thin Air was twice adapted for television.  In 1975 it was used as the basis for a first-season episode of The Rockford Files titled "Sleight of Hand."  In 1982 it was the basis for a second-season episode of Simon & Simon of the same name as the novel.

Works by Howard Browne

 Warrior of the Dawn (1943)
 Return to Liliput (1943)  (as by William Brengle)
 Halo in Blood (1946) (as by John Evans)
 If You Have Tears (1947) (as by John Evans)
 Halo for Satan (1948) (as by John Evans)
 The Man from Yesterday (1948) (as by Lee Francis)
 Forgotten Worlds (1948) (as by Lawrence Chandler)
 Halo in Brass (1949) (as by John Evans)
 The Taste of Ashes (1957) 
 The Return of Tharn (1956)
 Thin Air (1954)
 The Paper Gun (1985)
 Pork City (1988)
 Scotch on the Rocks (1991)
 Murder Wears a Halo (1997)
 Carbon-Copy Killer & Twelve Times Zero (1997)
 Incredible Ink (1997)

Notes

References

External links
 
 
 
 
 

1908 births
1999 deaths
Science fiction editors
American mystery writers
Shamus Award winners
20th-century American novelists
American male novelists
American speculative fiction editors
20th-century American male writers